David Blaine (born April 4, 1973) is an American illusionist, endurance artist, and extreme performer. He is best known for his high-profile feats of endurance and has set and broken several world records.

Early life 
Blaine was born and raised in Brooklyn, New York City, the son of a single mother, Patrice White, a teacher who was of Russian Jewish ancestry, and a father who is a Vietnam War veteran of Puerto Rican and Italian descent.  When Blaine was four years old, he saw a magician performing magic on the subway. This sparked a lifelong interest for him. He was raised by his mother and attended a Montessori school in Brooklyn. They later moved to Little Falls, New Jersey, where he attended Passaic Valley Regional High School. Per one account, his mother developed cancer when Blaine was 15 and died when he was 20. Per another, "When Blaine was 21, his mother was stricken with cancer and passed away in 1994." When Blaine was 17 years old, he moved to Manhattan, New York City.

Stunts and specials

Street Magic and Magic Man (1997)
On May 19, 1997, Blaine's first television special, David Blaine: Street Magic, aired on ABC. "It really, really does break new ground," said Penn Jillette of Penn & Teller. When asked about his performance style, Blaine explained, "I'd like to bring magic back to the place it used to be 100 years ago." Time commented, "His deceptively low-key, ultracool manner leaves spectators more amazed than if he'd razzle-dazzled."

In Magic Man, Blaine is shown traveling across the country, entertaining unsuspecting pedestrians in Atlantic City, Compton, Dallas, the Mojave Desert, New York City, and San Francisco, recorded by a small crew with handheld cameras. Jon Racherbaumer commented: "Make no mistake about it, the focus of this show, boys and girls, is not Blaine. It is really about theatrical proxemics; about the show-within-a-show and the spontaneous, visceral reactions of people being astonished." USA Today called Blaine the "hottest name in magic right now".

Buried Alive (1999)
On April 5, 1999, Blaine was entombed in an underground plastic box underneath a 3-ton water-filled tank for seven days, across from Trump Place on 68th St. and Riverside Boulevard, as part of a stunt titled "Buried Alive". According to CNN, "Blaine's only communication to the outside world was by a hand buzzer, which could have alerted an around-the-clock emergency crew standing by."

An estimated 75,000 people visited the site, including Marie Blood, Harry Houdini's niece, who said, "My uncle did some amazing things, but he could not have done this." On the final day of the stunt, April 12, hundreds of news teams were stationed at the site for the coffin opening. Blaine emerged and told the crowd, "I saw something very prophetic ... a vision of every race, every religion, every age group banding together, and that made all this worthwhile." BBC News stated, "The 26-year-old magician has outdone his hero, Harry Houdini, who had planned a similar feat but died in 1926 before he could perform it."

Frozen in Time (2000)
On November 27, 2000, Blaine performed a stunt called Frozen in Time, where he attempted and failed to stand in a large block of ice located in Times Square, New York City for 72 hours. It was covered on a TV special. He was lightly dressed and appeared to be shivering even before the blocks of ice were placed around him. A tube supplied him with air and water, while his urine was removed with another tube. He was encased in the box of ice for 63 hours, 42 minutes, and 15 seconds before being removed with chainsaws. The ice was transparent and resting on an elevated platform to show that he was actually inside the ice the entire time. He was removed from the ice and taken to a hospital due to fears he might be going into shock. The New York Times reported, "The magician who emerged from the increasingly unstable ice box seemed a shadow of the confident, robust, shirtless fellow who entered two days before." Blaine later said it took a month to fully recover and that he had no plans to attempt a stunt of this difficulty in the future. In 2010, a magician from Israel named Hezi Dean broke Blaine's record when he was encased in a block of ice for 66 hours.

Vertigo (2002)
He was not harnessed to the pillar, although there were two retractable handles on either side of him to grasp in the event of harsh weather. He remained on the pillar for 35 hours. He later said in his 2009 TED Talk that he had had severe hallucinations in the final hours of this stunt, causing the buildings and structures around him to look like animal heads.

Above the Below (2003)
On September 5, 2003, Blaine began an endurance stunt in which he was sealed inside a transparent Plexiglas box. A webcam was installed inside the box so that viewers could observe his progress. The stunt lasted 44 days, during which Blaine drank  of water per day and did not eat.

The stunt was the subject of public interest and media attention, The Times reported that "1,614 articles in the British press have made reference to the exploit." Then-US president George W. Bush referred to Blaine's stunt in a speech at the Whitehall Palace in London, saying, "The last noted American to visit London stayed in a glass box dangling over the Thames. A few might have been happy to provide similar arrangements for me." A number of spectators threw food and other items towards the box, including eggs, paint-filled balloons and golf balls, according to The Times. A McDonald's hamburger was flown up to the box by a remote-controlled helicopter as a taunt. The Evening Standard reported that one man was arrested for attempting to cut the cable supplying water to Blaine's box.

On September 25, BBC News reported that "if his endurance test is real rather than an elaborate illusion", then Blaine's claim of tasting pear drops indicates he is advancing through the first stage of starvation. A medical doctor said that the taste is caused by ketones, which are produced when the body burns fat reserves.

The stunt ended on October 19, and Blaine emerged in tears saying "I love you all!" and was subsequently hospitalized. The New England Journal of Medicine published a paper that documented his 44-day fast and stated his re-feeding was perhaps the most dangerous part of the stunt. The study reported, "He lost 25 percent of his original body weightand his body mass index dropped from 29.0 to 21.6. His appearance and body-mass index after his fast would not by themselves have alerted us to the risks of refeeding. Despite cautious management, he had hypophosphatemia and fluid retention, important elements of the refeeding syndrome."

Drowned Alive (2006)

On May 1, 2006, Blaine began his Drowned Alive stunt, which lasted seven days and involved a submersion in an  diameter, water-filled sphere containing isotonic saline in front of the Lincoln Center in New York City. During the stunt, he sustained kidney and liver damage. At the end of the stunt, Blaine attempted to free himself from handcuffs and chains after exiting the sphere. After the stunt, Blaine entered into an agreement with researchers at Yale University to monitor him in order to study the human physiological reaction to prolonged submersion.

Revolution (2006)
On November 21, 2006, Blaine began his Revolution stunt, where he was shackled to a rotating gyroscope without food or water, intending to escape within 16 hours. Blaine completed the stunt 52 hours later.

Guinness World Records (2008)
Blaine appeared on the April 30, 2008 episode of The Oprah Winfrey Show to attempt to break the Guinness World Record for oxygen-assisted static apnea, following his failure to break the then-current record of unassisted static apnea in his previous attempt Drowned Alive. The previous record was set by Peter Colat of Switzerland on February 10, 2008.

Before entering the  water tank, Blaine spent 23 minutes inhaling pure oxygen. Blaine held his breath for 17 minutes 4-1/2 seconds, surpassing Colat's previous mark of 16 minutes 32 seconds, setting a new Guinness World Record that stood until September 19, 2008, when it was surpassed by German diver Tom Sietas who during an episode of the American talk show Live with Regis and Kelly, held his breath for 17 minutes, 19 seconds.

Dive of Death (2008)

On September 18, 2008, Blaine announced his The Upside Down Man performance with Donald Trump. Blaine planned to hang upside down without a safety net for 60 hours. On September 22, Blaine began his stunt Dive of Death, hanging over Wollman Rink in Central Park and interacting with fans by lowering himself upside down. He pulled himself up to drink fluid and restore normal circulation. Reportedly, Blaine risked blindness and other maladies in the stunt. He was criticized when, only hours into the endurance challenge, he was seen standing on a waiting crane platform, not upside down as expected. During the stunt, he came down once an hour for a medical check and to use the bathroom.

What Is Magic? (2010)
In this 42-minute television special that aired in 2010, Blaine performed an illusion of catching a .22 caliber bullet fired from a rifle into a small metal cup in his mouth. The special also features 2008 footage of Blaine in New Orleans performing for people affected by Hurricane Katrina.

Electrified: One Million Volts Always On (2012)
On October 5, 2012, Blaine began performing a 72-hour endurance stunt called Electrified: One Million Volts Always On atop a 22-foot high pillar on Pier 54 in New York City, which was streamed live on YouTube. During the stunt, Blaine stood on the pillar surrounded by seven Tesla coils producing an electric discharge of one million volts or more continuously. The coils were directed at Blaine for the entirety of the endurance stunt, during which he did not eat or sleep. He wore  of gear, including a chainmail Faraday suit, designed to prevent electrical current from traveling through the body. John Belcher, a physics professor from the Massachusetts Institute of Technology, reportedly said, "He has a conducting suit, all the current is going through the suit, nothing through his body. There is no danger in this that I see."

At night, Blaine shivered uncontrollably from the inclement weather. The New York Times published an article describing the science behind Blaine's stunt. Members of the public were able to control the pattern of electric current by accessing screens, and musicians Pharrell Williams and Andrew W.K. performed solos on a keyboard which controlled the electric discharge.

The event concluded on October 8, 2012, at 8:44 pm. Blaine was able to walk away with assistance and was transported to a hospital for a medical check. Blaine donated two of the Tesla coils to the Liberty Science Center in Jersey City, New Jersey to be exhibited on permanent display.

Real or Magic (2013)
In 2013, Blaine starred in a 90-minute ABC television special, David Blaine: Real or Magic, on November 19, 2013. The special, directed by Matthew Akers, featured Blaine performing magic for celebrities and public figures. Real or Magic achieved a 2.5 rating in the 18–49 age bracket, and posted the best numbers in the 9:3011:00 pm time slot for ABC's 2013 season.

Beyond Magic (2016)
On November 15, 2016, ABC aired Beyond Magic, a 42-minute television special in which Blaine performs magic for various public figures. Among the  featured stunts is one in which Blaine seemingly catches a .22 caliber bullet in a small metal cup held between a gum shield in his mouth. The bullet catch trick was performed live on stage in front of 20,000 people in an August 2015 Las Vegas performance in which Blaine fired the gun himself. Blaine's mouthguard broke during the performance. Since then, Blaine has never performed the stunt again.

The Magic Way (2020)
On April 1, 2020, Blaine starred in David Blaine: The Magic Way, airing on ABC. The special consisted of various close-up magic acts, performing card tricks through video chat, and also performing in-person for many famous athletes, actors, and other celebrities as well as ordinary citizens. The special also includes performances by Blaine's daughter.

Ascension (2020)
In 2020, Blaine performed the David Blaine Ascension stunt, which involved him floating while holding on to a cluster of 52 helium-filled balloons using a harness. The stunt took place on the morning of September 2, 2020, in Page, Arizona and was streamed live on YouTube as a YouTube Original program. He landed successfully and without harm.

Other work

Writing
On October 29, 2002, Villard published Mysterious Stranger: A Book of Magic, an autobiography and armchair treasure hunt with instructions on performing magic tricks. The treasure hunt was created by game designer Cliff Johnson and solved by Sherri Skanes on March 20, 2004.

Philanthropy and charity work

In November 2006, Blaine performed a stunt in New York's Times Square in support of The Salvation Army. After 52 hours, Blaine escaped from the shackles that had held him in a spinning gyroscope suspended above the ground. Blaine said this stunt was particularly important to him since The Salvation Army had provided him with clothing while he was growing up.

On January 15, 2010, Blaine returned to Times Square to perform "Magic for Haiti", a performance lasting 72 hours which raised nearly US$100,000  for Haiti earthquake relief.

Blaine also donated two $1 million Tesla coils to Liberty Science Center after performing a massive electricity stunt.

During the COVID-19 pandemic in 2020, Blaine continued his hospital magic shows remotely via FaceTime and Zoom, with a particular focus on providing light relief and distraction for the frontline doctors, nurses and other health workers. In his own words, "the greatest satisfaction as a magician is bringing joy to people who can really use it. I'm so happy to do anything to show that I appreciate what they are all doing and going through."

Personal life 
Blaine and his former partner, Alizée Guinochet, have a daughter born on January 27, 2011.

Sexual assault allegations
In October 2017, following a report published in The Daily Beast in the wake of the Me Too movement, British news outlets reported that London's Metropolitan Police had asked Blaine to travel to the UK for interview under caution regarding allegations by former model Natasha Prince that Blaine had raped her at a house in Chelsea, West London, in 2004. Speaking through his lawyer, Blaine "vehemently denies" the allegations and confirmed that he would "fully co-operate" with a police inquiry. Detectives later declined to take further action after investigating her claim.

In April 2019, Blaine was investigated by the New York City Police Department over allegations that he sexually assaulted at least two women, although no charges were made, and he was not charged with a crime.

See also

 Hunger artist
 "Super Best Friends"

References

External links 

 
 
 
 "How I held my breath for 17 minutes" (TEDMED 2009) (also )

1973 births
American autobiographers
American magicians
American people of Italian descent
American people of Puerto Rican descent
American people of Russian-Jewish descent
American performance artists
American street performers
American stunt performers
Artists from Brooklyn
Living people
Mentalists
People from Little Falls, New Jersey
Philanthropists from New York (state)
Academy of Magical Arts Magician of the Year winners